Grave Secrets is the fifth novel by Kathy Reichs starring forensic anthropologist  Temperance Brennan.

Plot
Brennan is searching for human remains in mass graves in Guatemala when two colleagues are ambushed and shot. Meanwhile, Sergeant-detective Bartolome "Bat" Galiano of the Guatemala National Civil Police seeks her help in identifying remains found in a septic tank behind a run-down hotel in Guatemala City; could it be one of four young women reported missing, one of whom is the daughter of the Canadian ambassador? Why does the District Attorney confiscate the remains? And what is the link to the American President's recent ruling on stem cell research? With would-be lover Andrew Ryan becoming involved due to the Canadian link, and he and Galiano competing for her affections, Brennan tries to find out what happened to the missing girls and who is trying to stop her doing so.

External links
Kathy Reichs' page on Grave Secrets

Novels by Kathy Reichs
American crime novels
2002 American novels
Novels set in Guatemala
Charles Scribner's Sons books
Heinemann (publisher) books